TF1 Group is a French media holding company. Its best-known property is the broadcast network TF1.

The group was formed after TF1 was privatized in April 1987. It is controlled with a 43% stake by Bouygues, and is quoted on Euronext Paris.

History
The history of TF1 traces back to 1975, when the Office de Radiodiffusion-Télévision Française (ORTF) was split into 7 successor institutions. To provide competition for Canal+, La Cinq and M6, the French government decided to privatize TF1 in April 1987. Since then, it has been controlled by the Bouygues conglomerate after its privatization.

In June 2009, TF1 Group agreed to buy the NT1 channel from AB Groupe, as well as AB's 40% stake in TMC Monte Carlo (which would take TF1's total stake to 80%). The deal was cleared by France's competition authority and subsequently by the Council of State in December 2010, dismissing an appeal by Métropole Télévision. As part of the same transaction, the group raised its stake in WB Television to 49%.

On 21 December 2012, Discovery Communications purchased a 20% stake in Eurosport from TF1 Group for €170m. Discovery has the option to increase its stake to 51% in 2014. Should Discovery exercise its option, TF1 Group would have the ability to then exercise a put option over the remaining 49% that would see Discovery take full control. On 22 July 2015 Discovery agreed to acquire TF1's remaining 49% stake in the venture. Discovery also took a 20% share in TV Breizh, Histoire, Ushuaia TV and Stylia – for €14m, with the option of increasing its shareholding to 49% in each channel in 2014. Discovery and TF1's production arm will also work together on making programmes.

TF1 Group's Newen agree to acquire a majority stake in Reel One of Montreal in July 2019. Current owner and CEO Tom Berry would retain a minority stake in the company.

In December 2017, the TF1 group finds an agreement with the Canal+ group, The MYTF1 service and thus restored on CANAL decoders and on myCanal and also the control of live (Start-Over) is possible on myCanal. A similar episode occurs in September 2022. 

On 18 May 2021, TF1 Group and M6 Group announced that both companies have begun negotiations for a proposed merger. On 16 September 2022, the merger was officially abandoned due to competition concerns by the antitrust French authorities.

Operations
Newen - Paris-based TV production company
 Capa Drama, French banners
 Telfrance, French banners
 Nimbus, Denmark
 Tuvalu, Netherlands
Pupkin, Netherlands
De Mensen,  Belgium
 BlueSpirit, Canadian animation company
 Reel One, Canadian production outfit

Streaming service
Salto, with France Télévisions and Groupe M6
MY TF1

Television
TF1 Group owns or has a direct stake in the following television channels:

Free-to-air
TF1, channel 1
TMC, channel 10
TFX (launched in 2005 as NT1), channel 11
TF1 Séries Films (launched in 2012 as HD1), channel 20
LCI - La Chaîne Info (launched in 1994), channel 26

Pay
TV Breizh (launched in 2000)
TF1 International, TF1's international channel
Histoire TV (launched in 1997)
Ushuaïa TV (launched in 2005)
Série Club - 50% stake

Former
JET
Tfou TV
Stylia  (ex-Odyssée launched in 1996, closed in 2014) - 80% stake
TF6 (closed in 2014) - 50% stake

Other assets
The firm holds a number of other interests in the advertising, internet and publishing fields, including Aufeminin and 34% of Metro International's operations in France.

References

External links

Pan-European media companies
Television networks in France
French-language television networks
Companies listed on Euronext Paris
Television channels and stations established in 1975
1975 establishments in France
Companies based in Île-de-France